Redzwan Atan is a Singaporean footballer who plays for Balestier United Recreation Club as a defender in the National Football League (NFL) Division 1.

He started playing in the Sleague for Home United prime league squad in 2011 and was the captain of the prime league team  until 2013.  In 2014, he was promoted by the coach to the senior squad.

He is now playing for Balestier United Recreation Club.

Club career

Home United
He started playing for the Protectors in 2011 in their prime league team.

In 2014, he was promoted to the 1st team squad.

Balestier United Recreation Club
He signed for the Balestier United Recreation Club after being released by the Protectors at the end of 2016.

He made his debut for the team in the 1st match of the new season when the Balestier United Recreation Club beat favorite Singapore Cricket Club 3–0.

Career statistics

References

Singaporean footballers
Singapore Premier League players
1990 births
Living people
Association football defenders